Aaron Lister Brown aka Dixie Kid (23 December 1883 – 6 April 1934) was an American boxer.  He was a controversial contender for the World Welterweight Boxing Championship in April 1904.

Early life and career
Brown was born on December 23, 1883, in Fulton, Missouri.

From 1900 to 1903, he fought almost exclusively in southern California, primarily in Los Angeles and Oakland, most notably defeating contender Frank McConnell in a fourth-round knockout on December 30, 1902, and Mose LaFontise with a tenth-round knockout on July 10, 1903.  McConnell was a world welterweight championship contender against Mysterious Billy Smith in New York on January 26, 1900.  The mute Butte, Montana based boxer LaFontise had just fought the great Joe Walcott before meeting the Kid, and had twice defeated Fireman Jim Flynn, the only boxer to ever knock out Jack Dempsey.

On May 21, 1903, the Kid defeated Al Neill in a twenty-round points decision in San Francisco.  Neill was a welterweight contender who defeated Mysterious Billy Smith on a tenth round foul on January 23, 1902, and competed unsuccessfully for both the Middleweight and Welterweight championships of Australia in 1904-5.

Professional career

Attempt at the world welterweight championship against Joe Walcott, 1904

On April 29, 1904, Kid challenged Barbados Joe Walcott for the latter's World Welterweight Championship title. The Kid was down in the tenth round for a count of six. In the one sided contest, Walcott appeared to have a clear advantage in all but the seventh round. By the eleventh round, the tiring Kid began to clinch.  Walcott was winning the fight handily when the referee disqualified him with no evident explanation in the final seconds of the 20th round. "Duck Sullivan", the referee who made the strange call of foul, was a last minute replacement, and Walcott protested the choice before the bout began.   Many in the crowd were shocked with the decision, and Walcott himself was immediately angered at referee Sullivan who made the call. The match was disregarded as a title bout when it was discovered, not surprisingly, that referee Sullivan had bet on Dixie Kid to win the match.

On September 28, 1909, he lost to World Colored Heavyweight Champion Sam Langford in Boston, Massachusetts, when the Kid's handlers threw in the towel after the fifth round. Langford outweighed his opponent by at least twenty-five pounds. By most accounts, the "Kid" showed great cleverness in the bout eluding Langford's punches in the early rounds, and put up a skilled display of boxing in the close match.  In the third round, the Kid nearly stopped Langford with a series of body blows, and short jabs to the face. As Langford gained his stride, the "Kid" went down once in the fifth round and again as the bell sounded, and could not return to box in the sixth when the towel was thrown.

On November 1, 1909 he faced the impressive black boxer Jeff Clark and fought to an eight-round win, which he repeated on November 15.  In their fight of November 1, the bout was close for the first six rounds, but the Kid took the advantage in the seventh and knocked Clark to the mat at the end of the eighth, with the bell sounding before the count could be completed.  Clark would later fight for championships in Panama City, Panama against such exceptional black opponents as Kid Norfolk, a future International Boxing Hall of Fame recipient, Roughouse Ware, and Sam McVea.  Clark would take the Panamanian Heavyweight Title in May 1915.

Boxing in Europe 1910-20

Impressive victory over Georges Carpentier in Paris, 1911
On August 11, 1911, he defeated the formidable idol of France, Georges Carpentier, in a fifth-round technical knockout in Trouville.  According to one source, Carpentier was taking a terrific beating.  He later claimed he was not fully conditioned for the bout.

Loss to welterweight champion Harry Lewis in England, 1912

On January 18, 1912, he make a solid showing against world welterweight champion Harry Lewis, losing in an eighth-round technical knockout in a non-title fight in Liverpool, England.  Lewis showed the advantage throughout the bout.

On October 4, 1912, in Premierland, Paris, he lost to Marcel Thomas in a fifteen-round points decision.  The bout brought European world welterweight status to Thomas and had an impressive purse of $5000, equal to the better purses the Kid had split in the United States.  The Kid had the best of the earlier rounds, but Thomas came back in the later ones.

On April 25, 1912, the Kid soundly defeated an eighteen year old Georges Bernard at France's grand Cirq de Paris, in an eleventh-round technical knockout. The bout was billed as the 147 pound world title, putting it in the welterweight class.  About 1913, he trained Eugene Bullard as a boxer and arranged for him to fight in Paris.  Bullard, an African-American, became a fighter pilot during World War I.

The Kid completed his boxing career in Europe, featuring bouts in France, England, and Spain.

In his career as both welterweight and middleweight, he fought such notable fighters as Jimmy Clabby, Frank Mantell, Larry Temple, Dave Holley, Young Peter Jackson, welterweight champion Mike "Twin" Sullivan, and black heavyweight contender Sam Langford

Later life and death
Kid fought over 150 bouts and retired in 1920. In May 1922, he made a meager living playing the drum in an orchestra in Berlin, extending his European boxing tour after WWI and hoping to open a gymnasium. Near the end of his life in the summer of 1933 when Jimmy McLarnin became world welterweight champion, the Kid appeared at the young boxer's training camp, picking the junior welterweight as a rising star.

The Kid died April 6, 1934 in Los Angeles after falling out of a tenement story window. It is not known whether it was by accident or a suicide.  Sadly, he lived near poverty at the time of his death, making ends meet with odd jobs and the occasional donation.

Honours
Kid was inducted into the International Boxing Hall of Fame (2002).  Nat Fleischer placed the Kid as the fifth best welterweight in boxing history. Herb Goldman ranked him as the sixteenth welterweight in boxing history.  He was inducted into the Ring Boxing Hall of Fame in 1975.

Primary boxing achievement
The following table shows the date of Dixie Kid's bout with Joe Walcott, April 29, 1904, though the bout was later disregarded as the referee Sullivan was found to have bet on the Kid.  Dixie Kid's claim to the Welterweight Champion has since been disregarded by most boxing historians, as was his five-month claim to the title.

Professional boxing record
All information in this section is derived from BoxRec, unless otherwise stated.

Official Record

All newspaper decisions are officially regarded as "no decision" bouts and are not counted to the win/loss/draw column.

Unofficial record

Record with the inclusion of newspaper decisions to the win/loss/draw column.

See also
Lineal championship
List of welterweight boxing champions

References

External links

 
 CyberBoxingZone

1883 births
1934 deaths
Boxers from Missouri
International Boxing Hall of Fame inductees
People from Fulton, Missouri
American male boxers
Welterweight boxers